Saboyá is a town and municipality in the Western Boyacá Province, part of the Colombian department of Boyacá.

Etymology 
Saboyá in Chibcha means "Taste for the mantles".

History 
Before the Spanish conquest of the Muisca on the central highlands of the Colombian Andes, Saboyá was ruled by a cacique with the same name.

The first encomendero of Saboyá was Pedro de Galeano, brother of Martín Galeano and soldier in the army of Hernán Pérez de Quesada, brother of Spanish conquistador Gonzalo Jiménez de Quesada. Modern Saboyá was founded on October 4, 1556.

Simón Bolívar visited Saboyá on three occasions: January 2, 1821, September 6, 1827 and June 9, 1828.

Economy 
Main economical activities in Saboyá are agriculture and livestock farming. Among the agricultural products potatoes, maize and the fruits curuba, blackberries, tree tomatoes and strawberries are cultivated.

References 

Municipalities of Boyacá Department
Populated places established in 1556
1556 establishments in the Spanish Empire
Muisca Confederation
Muysccubun